Allan Border is a former international cricketer and captain of the Australia cricket team. A left-handed middle order batsman, he scored centuries in Test and One Day International (ODI) matches organised by the International Cricket Council (ICC). Border scored 11,174 runs in 156 Tests and captained Australia in 93 of them. He holds the record for consecutive appearances (153 matches) as a player in Tests. Border was named by Wisden as one of its five Cricketers of the Year in 1982. He was the second Australian player after Sir Donald Bradman to receive the Order of Australia (AM) for his contribution to cricket, and was one of 55 initial inductees of the ICC Cricket Hall of Fame.

Border made his Test debut against England in December 1978 at the Melbourne Cricket Ground. His first century came three months later against Pakistan at the same venue. Border's 27 Test hundreds were scored at 14 different grounds; 14 hundreds were made at venues outside Australia. In Tests, he was most successful against England accumulating eight centuries. Border's highest score of 205 – one of his two double centuries – came against New Zealand at the Adelaide Oval in 1987. As of 2012, he is thirteenth overall in the list of most hundreds in Test cricket.

In ODI cricket, Border scored his first century against India in 1980, when he made 105 not out. The performance ensured Australia's victory and he was named "Man of the match". Border went on to score two more centuries until the end of his career – the first of them came against Sri Lanka (118) and the last one against West Indies (127), which was also his highest score in the format – he remained not out on both occasions.

Key

Test cricket centuries

ODI cricket centuries

Notes

References

External links
 Player profile of Allan Border from CricketArchive

Border, Allan
Border